Roddie Haley (December 6, 1964 – February 17, 2022) was an American sprinter.

Biography
Haley ran on the American  4 × 400 m relay team at the 1987 Pan American Games and 1987 World Championships, winning gold medals at both events. He also finished eighth in the individual 400 metres at the 1987 World Championships.

He was an NCAA 400 meter champion as a freshman in college at the University of Arkansas, with a time of 44.20 seconds. Haley was also a nine-time All-American (four indoor, five outdoor) for coach John McDonnell, and one of the Razorbacks’ top performers both on the indoor and outdoor ovals.

Haley was also a three-time NCAA champion, including twice in the indoor 500 meters (1986–87) and once in the outdoor 400 meters (1985). He earned SWC titles indoors in the 440 yard dash (1985) and 600 yard dash (1987), and was a three-time SWC outdoor champion in the 400 meters (1985–87). Haley further captured a SWC title at the conference outdoor meet in 1985 in the 4x100 meter relay. He remains the outdoor 400 meter record holder with a time of 44.48 set in 1986. Haley was part of four SWC and four NCAA team championships in his three seasons, including contributing to the first national triple crown in school history in 1985.

Haley was inducted into the University of Arkansas Hall of Honors on September 2, 2016. He died on February 17, 2022, at the age of 57.

References

1964 births
2022 deaths
20th-century African-American sportspeople
People from Texarkana, Texas
Track and field athletes from Texas
Arkansas Razorbacks men's track and field athletes
American male sprinters
World Athletics Championships medalists
World Athletics Championships athletes for the United States
Athletes (track and field) at the 1987 Pan American Games
Pan American Games gold medalists for the United States
Pan American Games medalists in athletics (track and field)
Medalists at the 1987 Pan American Games